Hodet over vannet is a Norwegian comedy thriller film by director Nils Gaup. It became a big success at the Norwegian box office. In 1993, it was one of the ten most seen films in Norwegian movie theaters. In the year after, 1994, it won the Amanda Award for Best Norwegian Film in Theatrical Release.

It is a production of the production company Filmkameratene A/S. In 1996, an American remake of the film was released, Head Above Water, which starred Cameron Diaz and Harvey Keitel.

It was filmed at Yxnøy on Østerøya (East Island) in Sandefjord, Norway. It is inspired by Steven Spielberg's Jaws movies and various Alfred Hitchcock films.

Plot
The storyline revolves around a married couple, Lene (Lene Elise Bergum) and Einar (Svein Roger Karlsen), who is vacationing in Southern Norway. The husband leaves for a fishing trip with his friend Bjørn (Morten Abel). While they are gone, Lene is visited by Gaute (Reidar Sørensen), a former lover who arrives drunk. He spends the night at the vacation house but his heart stops before morning. On the next morning, Einar comes back from his fishing trip and discovers the dead body in the basement. The couple then tries to decide how to dispose of the body.

Cast

 Lene Elise Bergum as Lene
 Svein Roger Karlsen as Einar
 Morten Abel as Bjørn
 Reidar Sørensen as Gaute
 Jon Skolmen as the Police officer

Film music
The title track was recorded by pop artist Morten Abel who also plays the role of Bjørn in the film. On January 15, 1994, the song reached No. 9 in the Norwegian national record chart VG-lista for Top 10 Singles. It remains one of two times Morten Abel gained a hit on VG-lista.

Remake

In 1995, the film was sold to Hollywood for a remake production. Actor and filmmaker Kevin Costner was impressed with the film and later purchased the remake rights under Tig Productions in Hollywood. The American remake version, which is starring Cameron Diaz and Harvey Keitel, was directed by Jim Wilson. The U.S. version ultimately had little success at the box office in either country.

The U.S. version was rated PG-13 by the MPAA, while the Norwegian version was given a 15+ age restriction by the Norwegian Media Authority.

Awards and nominations
It was nominated for the Amanda Award for Best Nordic Film, Best Norwegian Film in Theatrical Release, Best Actor (Svein Roger Karlsen), and Best Actress (Lene Elise Bergum). It received the Amanda Award for Best Norwegian Film in Theatrical Release. It also became the movie of the year 1994. It was also nominated for an Oscar for Best Foreign Film.

References

External links
 

1990s black comedy films
1993 films
Norwegian comedy films
1993 comedy films